Jean Elizabeth Morrison Pigott, OC (May 20, 1924 – January 10, 2012) was a Canadian politician and businesswoman.

The daughter of Ottawa businessman George Morrison, her family has lived in the Ottawa Valley for four generations. She married Arthur Pigott in 1955. Pigott was president and CEO of her family's business, Morrison-Lamothe Bakery, one of only three women CEOs in Canada in the early 1970s. In 1976, she won a by-election in Ottawa—Carleton riding and became a Member of Parliament in the House of Commons of Canada as a Progressive Conservative.

In the 1979 federal election, she lost her seat to Liberal Party candidate Jean-Luc Pépin even though the Progressive Conservative Party made enough gains elsewhere in the country to form a minority government. The new Prime Minister, Joe Clark, hired Pigott as an advisor. In the 1980 federal election, she was the Tory candidate in Ottawa Centre, where she placed second to Liberal candidate John Evans.

Following the Tories' return to power under Brian Mulroney in the 1984 federal election, Pigott was appointed by Mulroney as chair of the National Capital Commission.

Pigott was the first woman to sit on the board of directors of Ontario Hydro and also sat on the board of Canadian Tire Corporation. She has also served as chair of the board of the Ottawa Congress Centre and the Centre for Studies of Children at Risk in Hamilton, Ontario.

In 1995, she was made an Officer of the Order of Canada for having "shown leadership and determination in ensuring the use of resources for positive growth and change at all levels of government".

Pigott received heart surgery during the 1970s and recovered from two strokes during her late seventies.

Jean Pigott died January 10, 2012 in Ottawa.

Archives 
There is a Jean Pigott fonds at Library and Archives Canada. Archival reference number is R12715.

References

External links
 

1924 births
2012 deaths
Businesspeople from Ottawa
Members of the House of Commons of Canada from Ontario
Officers of the Order of Canada
Politicians from Ottawa
Progressive Conservative Party of Canada MPs
Women in Ontario politics
Women members of the House of Commons of Canada